Anna Bornhoff (born 17 November 1981 in Hamm) is a German football striker. She currently plays for 1. FFC Turbine Potsdam.

Career 
Bornhoff began her career at the SG Sendenhorst. She then moved to the girls' team of SC Germania Stromberg. In 2000, she moved to the university in Bayreuth. She then played for SpVgg Bayreuth and FC Eintracht Münchberg. Bornhoff went to the second division side TSV Crailsheim in 2005. She became the team’s top scorer and won promotion to the Bundesliga. In 2007, she went to Berlin for a new job. She rejected offers from Tennis Borussia Berlin and newly promoted 1. FC Union Berlin and signed with 1. FFC Turbine Potsdam but cut her contract in late 2007 due to much work.

See also 
Football in Germany
List of football clubs in Germany

References

External links 
 Official homepage of 1. FFC Turbine Potsdam

1981 births
Living people
Sportspeople from Hamm
German women's footballers
1. FFC Turbine Potsdam players
Women's association football forwards
Footballers from North Rhine-Westphalia